Maz (also Romanized as Mez; also known as Marz and Moḩammadābād-e Maz) is a village in Mahmeleh Rural District, Mahmeleh District, Khonj County, Fars Province, Iran. At the 2006 census, its population was 873, in 179 families.

References 

Populated places in Khonj County